The 1996 United States presidential election in Kansas took place on November 5, 1996, as part of the 1996 United States presidential election. Voters chose six representatives, or electors to the Electoral College, who voted for president and vice president.

Kansas was won by former home state Senator Bob Dole (R-KS) over President Bill Clinton (D), with Dole winning 54.29% to 36.08% by a margin of 18.21%. Billionaire businessman Ross Perot (Reform Party of the United States of America-TX) finished in third, with 8.62% of the popular vote, a sharp decline from 1992, when Perot captured 27% of the state’s votes and held George H.W. Bush’s victory margin to just over five percentage points. , this is the last election in which Atchison County voted for a Democratic presidential candidate.

With 54.39% of the popular vote, Kansas proved to be Dole's second strongest state in the 1996 election after Utah. As of the 2020 election, this marks the only occasion since 1984 in which a Republican nominee for President won his state of birth.

Results

Results by county

See also
 United States presidential elections in Kansas
 Presidency of Bill Clinton

References

Kansas
1996
1996 Kansas elections